Vriesea sceptrum is a plant species in the genus Vriesea. This species is native to Brazil.

References

sceptrum
Flora of Brazil